Urban district may refer to:
 District
 Urban area
 Quarter (urban subdivision)
 Neighbourhood
Specific subdivisions in some countries:
 Urban districts of Denmark
 Urban districts of Germany
 Urban district (Great Britain and Ireland) (historic)
 Urban districts of the Netherlands
 Urban districts of Sweden
 Urban districts of Ukraine
 List of urban districts of Vietnam

Types of administrative division